Trissemus is a genus of beetles belonging to the family Staphylinidae.

The species of this genus are found in Europe and Japan.

Species:
 Trissemus abyssinicus (Raffray, 1877) 
 Trissemus acutipalpus Jeannel, 1951

References

Staphylinidae
Staphylinidae genera